Cecily Briant (11 August 1891 – 10 July 1971) was a British painter. Her work was part of the painting event in the art competition at the 1948 Summer Olympics.

References

1891 births
1971 deaths
20th-century British painters
British women painters
Olympic competitors in art competitions
People from Lambeth